hr3 is a German, public radio station owned and operated by the Hessischer Rundfunk (HR).

References

Radio stations in Germany
Radio stations established in 1972
1972 establishments in West Germany
Mass media in Frankfurt
Hessischer Rundfunk